The Swedish Brigade was a paramilitary unit composed of 400 Swedish volunteers to assist the White Guards during the 1918 Finnish Civil War. The brigade participated in the Battle of Tampere between 28 March and 6 April. 34 members of the Swedish Brigade were killed in action and up to 50 wounded. Notable members included the archaeologist Axel Boëthius and the historian Olof Palme who was killed in Tampere.

It is suspected that the Swedish volunteers killed the Estonian Deputy Prime Minister Jüri Vilms. Vilms had traveled to Finland for instructions to get diplomatic recognition for his newly sovereign nation, but went missing. According to the Swedish Brigade war diaries, they executed three Estonians in the village of Hauho in 2 May. One of them was described as ″well-dressed″ and was carrying a large sum of money.

References

External links 

Brigades of Sweden
Finnish Civil War
Expatriate military units and formations
Military units and formations established in 1918
Military units and formations disestablished in 1918
Swedish expatriates in Finland